Payroll Giving, Workplace Giving  or Give As You Earn (GAYE) is a scheme for UK taxpayers to donate money to UK Registered Charities.

Introduced in 1987, Payroll Giving allows employees to give money to the UK registered charity of their choice by having a deduction taken straight from their gross pay.  There is no tax for the charity to claim back, as no tax was deducted.

Some companies have put in place a matching gift program to match or part match their employee donations via Payroll Giving.

Administration

More than 8,500 employers in the UK currently operate the scheme, and circa 2% of UK employees participate. Participating employers deduct agreed sums of money from their employees pay before calculating tax, and forward the money to a payroll giving agency; the agency then distributes the money to registered UK charities in accordance with the employees wishes (minus an administration fee, which may vary considerably between agencies). Approximately 40% of employers cover this administration fee on behalf of their employees.

Payroll giving is operated by several agencies which do the administration and processing to link the donations to the correct charities. Employers have to choose which agency to operate with and may not pay the charities directly.

Payroll Giving is promoted within workplaces by a number of Professional Fundraising Organizations or charities.

Effects

On donors

The UK has a progressive Income Tax system with a top rate in 2015 of 45%. For higher rate tax payers this is a simpler way to donate to charity tax effectively than Gift Aid, as Gift Aid assumes all donations are from Basic rate Taxpayers (20% rate).

It is nonetheless possible to achieve the same result using Gift Aid, regardless of which tax band the donor is in, because the Gift Aid scheme allows higher rate taxpayers to reclaim the difference between higher and basic rate taxes.  For example, if a donor gives £80 via Gift Aid, this is equivalent to donating £100 via Payroll Giving.  In both cases, the benefit to the charity is £100 (disregarding the Transitional Relief payable until April 2011).  The cost to a basic rate taxpayer is £80 in both cases, as the £100 paid by Payroll Giving would otherwise have been taxed at 20%.  The cost to a higher rate taxpayer is £60 for the Payroll Giving donation (£100 less 40%), and initially £80 for the Gift Aid donation, although the higher rate taxpayer can later reclaim the £20 difference through his/her tax return.

On employers

As part of a broader corporate social responsibility policy, Payroll Giving offers employees the opportunity to channel their support for their social concerns whilst at the same time demonstrating the company’s credentials as a socially responsible business. Employers with high participation rates can win Bronze, Silver and Gold awards from the Government.  From 2012 the Government is also introducing a Platinum Quality Mark Award.

On charities
Charities benefit from their donations being tax free, and in some cases matched by employers.

References

Taxation in the United Kingdom
Donation
Payroll
Charity in the United Kingdom